City Clipper was a short-lived bus company in Southampton. It was an independent company which started operations on 23 April 2007, but ended six months later on 13 October 2007.

History

City Clipper started operations on 23 April 2007 from its operations base at Basepoint Business centre in the Chapel area of the city. They operated two circular routes that approximately outlined the city centre. Service C1 operated clockwise, with C2 operating the same route in reverse. The service was operated solely by five Plaxton Primos and employed 10 drivers.

Throughout the operation, the service was well publicised in the local papers, at first with an offer.

It came under a lot of criticism from Southampton residents, as first by people who thought that the service was unnecessary and would only add to the congestion. When the service started, many people claimed that the buses usually ran empty, and some people were glad when the service was withdrawn.

The City Clipper route competed in some areas with the City Loop service, currently operated by A2B Express Travel, which began in 2001 and also the Unilink City-Link service, both of which operate as a free service. City Clipper was an expansion of the City Loop service and linked Southampton Central station, West Quay, Ocean Village, Town Quay and St Mary's Stadium. Unlike the City Loop or City-Link passengers were required to pay a fixed fare.

City Clipper announced on 8 October 2007 that the service would end on 13 October 2007, the last bus being the 19:00 from Town Quay.  The company blamed lack of financial support from a number of unnamed parties for the closure of the service though (as above) it had been noted that it was common for City Clipper services to run empty or with few passengers even at peak times since the service began.

See also
List of bus operators of the United Kingdom
Unilink

References

External links

Flickr photo set of City Clipper images

British companies established in 2007
Companies disestablished in 2007
Former bus operators in Hampshire